Elachista tribertiella is a moth of the family Elachistidae that is endemic to Spain.

References

tribertiella
Moths described in 1985
Endemic fauna of Spain
Moths of Europe